Badhamia panicea is a species of slime mold in the family Physaraceae. It was first scientifically described in 1873.

Description
They look like a series of white round growths that are found in clusters on wood chips. As they mature the colour changes to dark grey before going to a light grey form. They have black spores and sit on thin red stems.

Habitat
They are found in humid areas like reptile tanks, especially if they contain wood chippings. In nature, they are common on fallen tree trunks, especially beech.

References

External links

Physaraceae